Erythrolamprus pygmaeus, the Amazon tropical forest snake, is a species of snake in the family Colubridae. The species is found in Ecuador, Peru, Brazil, Venezuela, and Colombia.

References

Erythrolamprus
Reptiles of Ecuador
Reptiles of Peru
Reptiles described in 1868
Taxa named by Edward Drinker Cope